Kropotkin is the name of several urban localities in Russia:
Kropotkin, Krasnodar Krai, a town in Kavkazsky District of Krasnodar Krai
Kropotkin, Irkutsk Oblast, a work settlement in Bodaybinsky District of Irkutsk Oblast